Bradford City Association Football Club were formed in 1903 and were elected into the Second Division before they had even played a game. Bradford City and Chelsea, in 1905, remain the only teams to be elected into the league before playing a competitive fixture. The club were promoted to the First Division when they won the Second Division title in 1907–08. In 1910–11 the club recorded their highest league position of fifth and also won their only major honour when captain Jimmy Speirs lifted the FA Cup after he scored the only goal to defeat Newcastle United 1–0 in the final replay. Bradford City's honours also include the Third Division North title in 1928–29 and the Third Division crown in 1984–85, as well as the Third Division North Challenge Cup in 1938–39.

Bradford City have spent two seasons in the Premier League. In 1999–2000, they avoided relegation with just 36 points, then a record low to stay up, after defeating Liverpool 1–0 in the final game with a headed goal from David Wetherall. The club have won promotion in a total of eight seasons and been relegated on ten occasions; three relegations in the previous seven seasons meant the 2007–08 season was their first in the fourth tier in 26 years. Bradford City have also played in European competition when they took one of England's two places in the Intertoto Cup in 2000. They defeated FK Atlantas and RKC Waalwijk before being knocked out by FC Zenit Saint Petersburg in the semi-finals.

Seasons

Key

P = Played
W = Games won
D = Games drawn
L = Games lost
F = Goals for
A = Goals against
Pts = Points
Pos = Final position

Div 1 = Football League First Division
Div 2 = Football League Second Division
Div 3 = Football League Third Division
Div 3N = Football League Third Division North
Div 4 = Football League Fourth Division
Prem = Premier League
Champ = Football League Championship
Lge 1 = Football League One
Lge 2 = Football League Two

PR = Preliminary Round
4Q = Fourth Qualifying Round
IR = Intermediate Round
R1 = Round 1
R2 = Round 2
R3 = Round 3
R4 = Round 4
R5 = Round 5
QF = Quarter-finals
QF/N = Quarter-finals – Northern Section
SF = Semi-finals
SF/N = Semi-finals – Northern Section
RU = Runners-up
W = Winners

Division shown in bold when it changes due to promotion or relegation.
Top scorer shown in bold with  when he set or equalled a club record.

Footnotes

A. : The League Cup was founded in the 1960–61 season.
B. : Figures include goals in the Football and Premier Leagues, FA Cup, League Cup, European competitions, playoffs, Full Members Cup, Football League Trophy, Football League Group Cup and the Football League Third Division North Challenge Cup.
C. : Bradford City were elected to the Second Division for the 1903–04 season.
D. : The Football League Third Division North Cup ran from the 1933–34 season until 1945–46 season.
E. : The 1939–40 season was abandoned in early September and all results annulled, after only three matches had been played.
F. : All FA Cup ties in 1945–46 were played on a two legged basis.
G. : The club successfully applied for re-election to the Football League.
H. : Bradford City were placed in the Third Division on league reorganization.
I. : Accrington Stanley resigned from the league after playing 33 matches. Their results were declared void, omitted from the calculation of the final league table and their league record expunged.
J. : David Layne's 36 goals, 34 in the league and two in the FA Cup, remain a club record.
K. : The 1981–82 season saw the introduction of three points for a win.
L. : The Football League Group Cup was founded in the 1981–82 season and lasted just two seasons.
M. : The Football League Trophy was founded in the 1983–84 season.
N. : Record includes a 0–0 draw against Lincoln City which was abandoned after 40 minutes due to a fire in the main stand. The result at the time was ordered to stand by the Football League.
O. : The Full Members Cup was founded in the 1985–86 season and lasted until the 1991–92 season.
P. : Lost in play-off semi-finals to Middlesbrough.
Q. : The Third Division was renamed the Second Division following the advent of the Premier League.
R. : Promoted via play-offs after defeating Notts County 2–0 in the final.
S. : The Second Division was renamed League One following the advent of the Championship.
T. : Promoted via play-offs after defeating Northampton 3–0 in the final.
U. : Lost to Swansea City in the Final.
V. : Lost in play-off semi-finals to Millwall.
W. : Lost in play-off final to Millwall.

References

Sources
Soccerbase
Football Club History Database
Football Site

Seasons
 
Bradford City
Seasons